The Necessary International Initiative, often shortened to NII, was a Trotskyist international grouping formed in March 1976 by groups considered to the left of the Fourth International, which the NII characterised as "centrism sui generis", although the British section disagreed with this analysis. It consisted of the FMR, Spartacusbund (BRD) and two Austrian groups which become the IKL. The British International-Communist League joined in September 1976. The group was based on common agreement over positions of other Trotskyist internationals on the Portuguese revolution of 1974/5. One of the groups that came out of them was Workers Power (Germany) which is now a member of the League for a Fifth International, as is part of the British section which split in 1976.

References

External links
 History of the NII as part of The Death Agony of the Fourth International, a book published by the League for the Fifth International
 International Bolshevik Tendency article mentioning them

Trotskyism
Trotskyist political internationals